Chatman Branch is a  long 1st order tributary to the Dan River in Halifax County, Virginia.

Course 
Chatman Branch rises about 0.5 miles east of Omega, Virginia, and then flows north to join the Dan River about 2 miles north-northeast of Omega.

Watershed 
Chatman Branch drains  of area, receives about 45.6 in/year of precipitation, has a wetness index of 387.79, and is about 66% forested.

See also 
 List of Virginia Rivers

References 

Rivers of Virginia
Rivers of Halifax County, Virginia
Tributaries of the Roanoke River